Firing the Cathedral is a novella by British fantasy and science fiction writer Michael Moorcock. It is part of his long-running Jerry Cornelius series.

References

2002 British novels
Novels by Michael Moorcock
British novellas
Books with cover art by Richard M. Powers
PS Publishing books